Rambam Mesivta is a private Jewish High School in Lawrence, Nassau County, New York. Rambam Mesivta was founded in 1991, designed with an all-boys Mesivta program that offers classes in religious Jewish studies and college preparatory studies. Students attend from  Queens, Brooklyn, Great Neck, Five Towns, Plainview, West Hempstead, and Greater Long Island.

Rav Zev Meir Friedman serves as Rosh HaMesivta and Rabbi Yotav Eliach (author of Judaism, Zionism, and the Land of Israel) serves as Principal.

History 
Rambam Mesivta was founded in 1991. 

In 2006 Rambam Mesivta entered into a partnership with longtime rival HAFTR High School, called the Torah Institute. This move was intended to pool resources and to raise the standard of religious education in HAFTR and secular education in Rambam. It also helped create Rambam's sister school, the now-defunct Midreshet Shalhevet. This deal ended partially as a result of the 2008 financial crisis and was due to a large deficit Shalhevet created. This was a result of increased distribution of need-based scholarships. In the end, HAFTR refused to fund the deficit thus ending the deal. Shalhevet though was able to cover the deficit through a fundraising campaign and was able to remain open.

In 2020 due in part to the COVID-19 Pandemic, the sister school Shalhevet was forced to close permanently.

In the fall of 2022, just after the beginning of the school year, Rambam Mesivta moved to a newly built facility in Inwood. The new facility though, significantly bigger than the previous one, wasn’t designed to accommodate additional students.

Awards and recognitions 
Rambam Mesivta was honored with the National Blue Ribbon School Award of Excellence in 2015 & 2022 for its high scholastic performance, as measured by SAT and other standardized tests. Rambam was the second Yeshiva on Long Island to have ever been honored with this prestigious award. Out of a possible 133,00 public, private, and parochial schools that could apply for the award, only 39 Jewish, yeshivas, or community schools have qualified to date.

Athletics 
Rambam Mesivta has multiple athletic teams including hockey, basketball, flag football, soccer, tennis, and softball.

Rambam's strongest sport is currently hockey, as the Varsity team has made it to the playoffs several times during the past decade, most recently in the 2021–2022 season. However, historically, Rambam has also achieved notable milestones in other sports. In 1997, the Rambam varsity basketball team won the MYHSAL championship, defeating Flatbush in the championship game at the Meadowlands Arena. Rambam's varsity basketball team also won Yeshiva University's Saracheck Tournament Tier I championship in both 1996 and 1997, defeating YULA in the championship game in consecutive years. And on the baseball diamond, Rambam's varsity softball team won MYHSAL championships in both 1996 and 1997.

Activism 
Rambam Mesivta is notable for encouraging its student body to be involved with "Jewish activism and political awareness". Congresswomen Kathleen M. Rice, in recognizing the school for achieving the Blue Ribbon award, stated as follows:"within days of the 2004 earthquake and tsunami in Southeast Asia, which killed more than 250,000 people, students from Rambam Mesivta raised more than $6,000 to help rebuild schools and buy school supplies in Sri Lanka. Following the tragic 2014 terrorist attack at the Har Nof synagogue in Jerusalem, in which four Jewish worshipers were killed, a group of 10th graders from Rambam Mesivta responded immediately with a campaign to raise money for the victims' families. Within a day of the attack, the students had raised nearly $20,000, and within 10 days, they raised over one million. Nearly two months after they launched their campaign, this passionate and caring group of students raised over two million dollars." Students at Rambam were among the picketers in front of the Polish consulate in NY to protest Polish action against a historian documenting Polish collusion with the Nazis during WWII. The protest led to a meeting between the dean of the high school, Rabbi Friedman, and the Polish consul-general, Urszula Gacek, attempting to find common ground. In the end, they were successful and Jakiw Palij was deported to Germany.

Staff 
 Rosh HaMesivta – Rabbi Zev M. Friedman 
 Principal – Rabbi Yotav Eliach (author of Judaism, Zionism, and the Land of Israel)
 Assistant Principal – Rabbi Avi Haar 
 Associate Principal – Mr. Hillel Goldman
 Director of Israel Guidance – Rabbi Avi Herschman
 Director of College Guidance – Mrs. Marcy Farrel
 Athletic Director – Steve Howard
 Head of IT – Yoni Gross

See also 

 Freeport High School (New York)
 Paul D. Schreiber Senior High School 
 Plainview – Old Bethpage John F. Kennedy High School

References

External links
 Rambam Mesivta - YouTube

Jewish day schools in New York (state)
Educational institutions established in 1993
Private high schools in New York (state)
1993 establishments in New York (state)
Schools in Nassau County, New York
Jews and Judaism in Nassau County, New York
Maimonides